True north refers to the direction of the North Pole relative to the navigator's position.

True north or True North may also refer to:

Places
 True North, a mine in the Fairbanks mining district
 "True North", a poetic name for Canada, first used by Alfred Lord Tennyson and popularized by the national anthem "O Canada"

Arts, entertainment, and media

Literature 
 True North (George book), a business book by Bill George
 True North (novel), by Kathryn Lasky, a young adult novel set in the 1850s against a background of slavery 
 True North, a 2004 novel by Jim Harrison, set in Michigan's Upper Peninsula, a family is torn apart by a reckless father
 True North, a memoir by Jill Ker Conway
 True North, a non-fiction book about Canada's territories by William R. Morrison
 True North, a comics anthology edited by Derek McCulloch

Music 
 True North Records, Canada's oldest independent record company
 True North (Bad Religion album), 2013
 True North (Borknagar album), 2019
 True North, a 2000 album by Fisher
 True North, a 2008 album by Gustav Bertha
 True North (Michael Chapman album), 2019
 True North (Twila Paris album), 1999
 "True North", a 2019 song by Rend Collective from their album Sparkle. Pop. Rampage.
 "Truenorth", a 2008 song by No-Man from their album Schoolyard Ghosts
 "Truenorth", a 2014 song by In Hearts Wake from their album Earthwalker
 True North (A-ha album and film), 2022

Production companies
 Truenorth (production company), an Icelandic film and television production company
 True North Productions, a British television production company based in Leeds

Television
 "True North" (Law & Order), an episode of Law & Order
 "True North" (Once Upon a Time), an episode of Once Upon a Time
 The True North, a 1967 Canadian documentary television series
 Les Pays d'en haut, a 2016-21 Canadian drama television series released as True North in some markets

Other uses in arts, entertainment, and media
 True North (2006 film), a Scottish film
 True North, a radio show on CKLU-FM Sudbury
True North (2020 film), a Japanese-Indonesian animated film based on accounts of North Korean prison camps

Website/news 

 True North right-wing news site operated by True North Centre for Public Policy

Brands and enterprises
 True North Sports & Entertainment, a Canadian company that owns the Winnipeg Jets of the National Hockey League
 True North Centre for Public Policy, a conservative Canadian media outlet
 True North Specialty Products, a Canadian company that sells forestry management and vegetation control chemicals
 TrueNorth, a neuromorphic computer chip
 True North, a brand of nuts made by B&G Foods

Ships 
 True North, a Canadian yacht in the 1987 America's Cup
 True North Centre, the former name of the MTS Centre in Winnipeg, Manitoba

Thoroughbreds
 True North I (foaled 1940), American Thoroughbred racehorse
 True North III (foaled 1966), American Thoroughbred racehorse
 True North Handicap, a Thoroughbred horse race